Luitgard of Wittichen (1291–1348) was a German nun, mystic and founder of a convent.

Life and works 
Luitgard (also Lutgard) of Wittichen was born in 1291 in Schenkenzell in the Black Forest and came from a simple, peasant background. At the age of twelve she was admitted to a beguine house in Oberwolfach in the valley of the river Wolf, where she lived for 20 years in voluntary poverty. As the result of a vision of Christ she was called to found a convent. She went on trips to the Tyrol and Switzerland to raise funds for the founding of the convent. She was treated unjustly by the dukes of Teck at the nearby castle of Schiltach, while the lords of Geroldseck at the Schenkenburg were devoted to her. In 1324 Luitgard moved to the Wittichen valley and founded a hermitage (Klause) for herself and 33 other women, which later became the   tertiary convent of Wittichen. The number of women was based on the 33-line Canticle of the Sun, a canticle by Saint Francis of Assisi, although the number of women doubled even in Luitgard's lifetime. She was the abbess of the convent until her death.

Luitgard cared for victims of the plague, before she herself succumbed to the epidemic. She is worshipped in central Baden as a "people's saint" (Volksheilige) even though she was never ordained or raised to the sainthood. She is remembered on 16 October, the date she died. On the second Sunday in October, the Luitgard Festival takes place in Wittichen. Luitgard is believed to have been familiar with the writings of Meister Eckhart and Heinrich Seuse and is regarded as a mystic in her own right. Luitgard died on 16 October 1348 at Wittichen Abbey near Schenkenzell.

This founder of a convent, who has been described as charismatic, may be seen from today's perspective as an emancipated woman.

Her spiritual father, the priest, Berchtold of Bombach, published a biography of Luitgard in around 1350. In 1629, according to tradition, when her coffin was opened, her brain was found to be in completely sound condition, a phenomenon that could not be explained by doctors or chemists at that time and, being seen as a miracle, was the reason for subsequent veneration and pilgrimages.

The St. Luitgard Care Home in Oberwolfach is named after her.

References

Literature 
 Berthold von Bombach, Arnold Guillet: Das Leben der heiligen Luitgard von Wittichen (1291-1348), die Heilige des Mutterschosses. Neudruck: Christiana, 1976, .
 Gertrud Jaron Lewis, Frank Willaert, Marie-José Govers: Bibliographie zur deutschen Frauenmystik des Mittelalters. Verlag Schmidt, 1989, p. 248, .
 Irmtraud Just: Die Vita Luitgarts von Wittichen: Text des Donaueschinger Codex 118. Peter Lang, 2000, .
 Peter Dinzelbacher, Deutsche und niederländische Mystik des Mittelalters, Berlin, 2010, Register s.v.

External links 
 .
 Internet site of Schenkenzell.
 Luitgard at heiligenlexikon.de

German Roman Catholic abbesses
1291 births
1348 deaths
14th-century German women